Heinrichs is a surname derived from Heinrich. Notable people with this name include:

 April Heinrichs (born 1964), American soccer player
 Conrad-Oskar Heinrichs (1890–1944), German General during World War II
 Dolph Heinrichs (1883–1967), Australian sportsman
 Erik Heinrichs (1890–1965), Finnish general
 Jason Heinrichs (born 1970), Canadian musical producer
 Josh Heinrichs (born 1981), American singer/musician
 Leo Heinrichs (1867–1908), a German-born Roman Catholic priest
 Rick Heinrichs, American film production designer
 Wolfhart Heinrichs (1941–2014), German Arabist

See also 
 Heinrich (disambiguation)

Surnames from given names